Decalesis salicifolia is a species of flowering plant in the family Apocynaceae, native to the Laccadive Islands and south-west India.

References

Periplocoideae
Flora of the Laccadive Islands
Flora of India (region)
Plants described in 1883